Pine Mills German Methodist Episcopal Church is an historic building located in Muscatine County, Iowa, United States.  The building was built by volunteers in 1867.  The congregation was made up of German immigrants who desired to maintain their own language and culture in their religious practices.  The last service was held in the church on Christmas Eve 1910.  The building passed to private ownership and was used as a farm building and workshop.  Over the years the building deteriorated because of disuse.  It was donated by Paul Kemper, who owned it, to the Muscatine Area Heritage Association.  Renovation of the former church was spearheaded by the American Schleswig Holstein Heritage Society and the Muscatine Community Foundation.  The building was listed on the National Register of Historic Places in 2003.

References

Churches completed in 1867
German-American culture in Iowa
National Register of Historic Places in Muscatine County, Iowa
Churches in Muscatine County, Iowa
Churches on the National Register of Historic Places in Iowa
Former Methodist church buildings in Iowa
19th-century Methodist church buildings in the United States